Oblivion is a steel roller coaster located at Alton Towers in Staffordshire, England. The prototype Dive Coaster model from Bolliger & Mabillard opened to the public on 14 March 1998 and was marketed as the "World's first vertical drop roller coaster".

History 
Throughout 1997, the park's 'Fantasy World' area was closed and all its former rides removed, except the Black Hole. Details about Oblivion were not revealed until March 1998. The "SW4" codename stood for "Secret Weapon 4", after Nemesis' codename, "SW3".

Oblivion's opening was accompanied by a large promotional campaign, including appearances on Blue Peter, news channels and cereal boxes. Prior to its opening, memorabilia including its own brand of deodorant was available to purchase. The total cost to construct the ride was estimated at £12 million.

The park area containing Oblivion was redesigned as 'X Sector'. The only surviving ride from the former area was the Black Hole roller coaster, which was externally redesigned to suit the new theme. Alton Towers moved and rethemed two existing rides from other areas of the park to open with X-Sector, Energizer and Enterprise. 

Despite advertising the ride as the "worlds first vertical drop rollercoaster", Oblivion's vertical drop is slightly less than 90 degrees, at 87.5 degrees. This is due to the trains lacking sprung wheel assemblies which would mean the transition from vertical to horizontal would be uncomfortable.

For a brief period in April 2011, the ride was sponsored by Fanta. The Fanta company also had put the Oblivion rollercoaster into one of their adverts to show that the brand was being sponsored there. However, much of the Fanta branding was removed after only a few months "following numerous complaints about the obtrusive nature of the brand".

On 8 May 2012, a reportedly suicidal 20-year-old man climbed over tall safety fencing and managed to access the underground ride area. He reportedly entered via the tunnel exit portal and walked underground, emerging on a ledge around the entrance portal. Neither he nor any guests on the ride were harmed. He was arrested for a public order offence and the ride returned to normal operation the following day.

Ride experience 

The queue line spirals upwards around a mound and passes through abstract buildings at various levels. Through the buildings, an unnamed man stood in darkness (played by actor Renny Krupinski) briefs riders from overhead television screens. In the heavily stylised videos, the sinister figure explains at length the supposed physical and psychological effects of riding on Oblivion. Although adapted from scientific fact, his monologues are deliberately exaggerated with hyperbole and dry humour. The third queueline video features an alter-ego character (who appears glowing white) arguing with his counterpart as to whether Oblivion is truly safe for riders. This was removed in 2015 after The Smiler crash.

The queue then splits and crosses caged bridges into the station building. Here riders are batched into rows and board the ride cars. Technical graphics are displayed on overhead screens, which change to play a final monologue upon dispatch.

The cars accommodate sixteen passengers in two rows of eight with a tiered seating arrangement. The roller coaster has a simple layout with a 180 ft drop at 87.5 degrees. The car slowly ascends 60 feet at a 45-degree angle to build tension, then levels out and travels slowly through a turn towards the drop. The turn uses a horizontal chain mechanism not used on any other B&M dive coaster.

The car reaches the drop and pauses facing over the edge for approximately 3 seconds (1 second on busier days). The car is then released, free-falling into the underground tunnel. Upon exiting the other side, a high-banked turn takes riders around into the brake run. There are two on-ride photos; one at the start of the drop and the other at the end of the high-banked turn.

References

External links 

 Oblivion at the official Alton Towers website
 
 Oblivion review and photos on T-Park

Dive Coaster roller coasters
Roller coasters in the United Kingdom
Roller coasters operated by Merlin Entertainments
Roller coasters introduced in 1998
Alton Towers
Rides designed by John Wardley
Dive Coasters manufactured by Bolliger & Mabillard